The Alameda is a historic apartment building located at Indianapolis, Indiana.  It was built about 1925, and is a three-story, rough cast buff brick building. It has commercial storefronts on the first floor.  It features distinctive spandrels with basketweave pattern brickwork.

It was listed on the National Register of Historic Places in 1983.

References

Apartment buildings in Indiana
Residential buildings on the National Register of Historic Places in Indiana
Residential buildings completed in 1925
Residential buildings in Indianapolis
National Register of Historic Places in Indianapolis